The Philippine Constitutional Commission of 1986 was the constitutional convention tasked with drafting the present iteration of the Constitution of the Philippines in 1986.

Sessions
Regular Session: June 2 – October 15, 1986

Legislation

Leadership
President: Cecilia Muñoz-Palma

Vice President: Ambrosio B. Padilla

Floor Leader: Napoleon G. Rama

Assistant Floor Leaders:
José D. Calderón   
Ahmad Domocao Alonto
Secretary General: Flerida Ruth Pineda-Romero

Members
A nomination process was held to select the members of the commission. The commission was composed of 48 national, regional, and sectoral representatives, which included lawyers, entrepreneurs, politicians, landlords, health professionals, religious leaders, labor and peasant leaders, university professors, and journalists.

 Resigned on August 28, 1986.

See also
First Philippine Commission
Second Philippine Commission
Congress of the Philippines
Senate of the Philippines
House of Representatives of the Philippines

References

Further reading
Philippine House of Representatives Congressional Library

External links

 
 Official Gazette Archives on the 1986 Constitutional Commission
 Records of the 1986 Constitutional Commission
  (Published online: April 18, 2012)

Constitutional conventions (political meeting)
Political history of the Philippines
History of the Congress of the Philippines
Constitutional Commission
pages=79-101